No Ordinary World is the seventeenth studio album by Joe Cocker, released on 9 September 1999 in Europe and on 22 August 2000 in USA. The US edition of the album features two bonus tracks and has different cover artwork. Notable songs on the album include a cover of Leonard Cohen's "First We Take Manhattan" and "She Believes in Me" co-written by Bryan Adams, who had also provided backing vocals for the song.

Track listing
"First We Take Manhattan" – 3:44 (Leonard Cohen)
"Different Roads" – 4:58 (Stephen Allen Davis, Steve DuBerry)
"My Father's Son" – 4:29 (Graham Lyle, Conner Reeves)
"While You See a Chance" – 3:51 (Will Jennings, Steve Winwood)
"She Believes in Me" – 4:44 (Bryan Adams, Eliot Kennedy)
"No Ordinary World" – 3:52 (Lars Anderson, Stephen Allen Davis)
"Where Would I Be Now" – 5:27 (Michael McDonald, Tony Joe White)
"Ain't Gonna Cry Again" – 4:06 (Peter Cox, Peter-John Vettese)
"Soul Rising" – 3:57 (Peter Cox, Graham Gouldman, Peter-John Vettese)
"Naked Without You" – 4:31 (Rick Nowels, Andrew Roachford, Billy Steinberg)
"Love to Lean On" – 4:17 (Steve Diamond, Wayne Kirkpatrick)
"On My Way Home" – 4:13 (Jean-Jacques Goldman, Michael Jones)
"Lie to Me" – 4:01 (J. McCabe, David Z)
"Love Made a Promise" – 5:03 (Paul Brady, Mark Nevin)

''Tracks 13 & 14 available only on US edition of the album. In Europe both songs were only released as B-sides to different singles.

Personnel 

 Joe Cocker – lead vocals
 Spike Edney – synthesizers (1, 10)
 Chris Elliot – acoustic piano (1, 2), Rhodes piano (2), clavinet (3), Wurlitzer electric piano (3)
 John Savannah – Hammond organ (1-3, 7, 10), electric piano (2), acoustic piano (6)
 Jason Rebello – acoustic piano (3, 7, 10), clavinet (3), electric piano (7)
 Peter-John Vettese – keyboards (4, 8, 9), acoustic piano (4, 8, 9), Hammond organ (4, 8, 9), melodica (4, 9), programming (4, 8, 9)
 Mark Evans – additional programming (4)
 Peter Gordeno – keyboards (5, 11)
 C. J. Vanston – keyboards (5, 11), Rhodes piano (5), synth strings (5, 7), synth percussion (5), synth vibes (10), clavinet (11), Hammond organ (11)
 David Clayton – synthesizers (6)
 Jean-Jacques Goldman – keyboards (12), acoustic guitar (12), backing vocals (12)
 Tim Pierce – electric guitar (1, 3, 10)
 Steve McEwan – electric guitar (1, 3, 6, 7), acoustic guitar (2, 7)
 Steve Power – electric guitar (1)
 Melvin Duffy – pedal steel guitar (1, 6, 7)
 Billy Lang – electric guitar (2), acoustic guitar (6)
 Adam Seymour – electric guitar (2, 3, 10), acoustic guitar (10)
 Robbie McIntosh – guitar (4, 8, 9), electric guitar (6)
 Michael Thompson – guitar (5, 11)
 Patrice Tison – guitar (12)
 Dave Catlin-Birch – bass (1, 2, 7)
 Neil Stubenhaus – bass (1-3, 5, 10, 11)
 Neil Harland – bass (4, 9)
 Mark Smith – bass (6)
 Guy Delacroix – bass (12)
 Jeremy Stacey – drums (1-4, 6-10)
 John Robinson – drums (5, 11)
 Christopher Deschamps – drums (12)
 Andy Duncan – percussion (1, 2, 7, 10), drum programming (6)
 Chris White – tenor saxophone (3), baritone saxophone (3)
 Neil Sidwell – trombone (3)
 Steve Sidwell – trumpet (3)
 Chris Cameron – string arrangements (2, 6, 10)
 Richard Niles – string arrangements (4, 9)
 Gavyn Wright – string conductor (2, 6, 10)
 Mary Carewe – backing vocals (1-3, 6, 7, 10)
 Helen Hampton – backing vocals (1-3, 6, 7, 10)
 Katie Kissoon – backing vocals (1-3, 6, 7, 10)
 Bryan Adams – backing vocals (5)
 Natalie Jackson – backing vocals (5, 11)
 Mortonette Jenkins – backing vocals (5, 11)
 Marlena Jeter – backing vocals (5, 11)
 Tommy Blaize – backing vocals (8, 9)
 Lance Ellington – backing vocals (8, 9)
 Keith Murrell – backing vocals (8, 9)
 Michael Jones – backing vocals (12)

Production 

 Joe Cocker – executive producer 
 Roger Davies – executive producer
 Steve Power – producer (1, 2, 3, 6, 7, 10, 13, 14), mixing (1, 2, 3, 6, 7, 10)
 Peter-John Vettese – producer (4, 8, 9), mixing (4, 8, 9)
 Pete Smith – producer (5, 11), mixing (5, 11)
 Jean-Jacques Goldman – producer (12)
 Matt Tait – engineer (1, 2, 3, 6, 7, 10)
 Matt Lawrence – assistant engineer (1-4, 6, 7, 10)
 Andy Haller – overdub engineer (1, 2, 3, 10), engineer (5, 11)
 Andy Hasegawa – assistant overdub engineer (1, 2, 3, 10), assistant engineer (5, 11)
 James Brumby – Pro Tools engineer (1, 2, 3, 6, 7, 10)
 Richard Flack – Pro Tools engineer (1, 2, 3, 6, 7, 10)
 Matt White – mix assistant (1, 2, 3, 6, 7, 10)
 Mark Evans – engineer (4, 8, 9)
 Mike Bigwood – string recording (4, 9)
 Chris Potter – vocal recording for Bryan Adams (5)
 Mike Beckett – vocal recording assistant (5)
 Andy Scott – engineer (12)
 Antoine Gaillet – assistant engineer (12)
 Norman Moore – art direction, design 
 Greg Gorman – photography

Studios 
 Tracks 1, 2, 3, 6, 7, 10, 13 & 14 recorded at Metropolis Studio (London, UK). Tracks 1, 2, 3 & 10 overdubbed at Record Plant (Los Angeles, CA, USA). Mixed at Battery Studios (London, UK).
 Tracks 4, 8 & 9 recorded at Area21, Brittania Row Studios and Olympic Studio 1 (London, UK). Mixed at Brittania Row Studios.
 Tracks 5 & 11 recorded at Record Plant (Los Angeles, CA, USA). Mixed at Nomis Studios (London, UK).
 Track 12 recorded at Twin Studio (Paris, France).

Charts

Weekly charts

Year-end charts

Certifications

References

1999 albums
Joe Cocker albums
Parlophone albums
Eagle Records albums